Bouchetmella is a genus of small sea snails, marine gastropod mollusks in the family Pyramidellidae, the pyrams and their allies.

Species
 Bouchetmella assimilis Peñas & Rolán, 2016
 Bouchetmella boucheti Peñas & Rolán, 2016
 Bouchetmella distorta Peñas & Rolán, 2016
 Bouchetmella microstriata Peñas & Rolán, 2016
 Bouchetmella minor Peñas & Rolán, 2016
 Bouchetmella representata Peñas & Rolán, 2016

References

 Peñas A. & Rolán E. (2016). Deep water Pyramidelloidea from the central and South Pacific. 3. The tribes Eulimellini and Syrnolini. Universidade de Santiago de Compostela. 304 pp.

External links

Pyramidellidae